{{DISPLAYTITLE:C15H12O8}}
The molecular formula C15H12O8 (molar mass : 320.25 g/mol, exact mass : 320.053217) may refer to:
 Ampelopsin (also known as dihydromyricetin), a flavanonol
 Dihydrogossypetin, a flavanonol